Events from the year 1848 in Russia

Incumbents
 Monarch – Nicholas I

Events

 
 
  
  
 Petrashevsky Circle

Births

Deaths

References

Further reading
  Lincoln, W.B. "Russia and the European Revolutions of 1848" History Today (Jan 1973), Vol. 23 Issue 1, pp 53-59 online. 

1848 in Russia
Years of the 19th century in the Russian Empire